Alder River is a small community in the Canadian province of Nova Scotia, located in the Municipality of the District of Guysborough in Guysborough County.

References
Alder River on Destination Nova Scotia

Communities in Guysborough County, Nova Scotia